Zavreliella is a genus of non-biting midges in the subfamily Chironominae of the bloodworm family Chironomidae.

Species
These 14 species belong to the genus Zavreliella:

 Zavreliella acuta Reiss, 1990 c g
 Zavreliella brauni Reiss, 1990 c g
 Zavreliella cranstoni Reiss, 1990 c g
 Zavreliella curta Reiss, 1990 c g
 Zavreliella fittkaui Reiss, 1990 c g
 Zavreliella furcata Reiss, 1990 c g
 Zavreliella junki Reiss, 1990 c g
 Zavreliella lata Reiss, 1990 c g
 Zavreliella levis Reiss, 1990 c g
 Zavreliella lobata Reiss, 1990 c g
 Zavreliella longiseta Reiss, 1990 c g
 Zavreliella marmorata (Wulp, 1858) i c g b
 Zavreliella molesta Reiss, 1990 c g
 Zavreliella verrucosa Reiss, 1990 c g

Data sources: i = ITIS, c = Catalogue of Life, g = GBIF, b = Bugguide.net

References

Chironomidae
Diptera of Europe